High Contrast is an album by Hungarian jazz guitarist Gábor Szabó, 
produced by Tommy LiPuma and recorded by Bruce Botnick at Capitol Studios, Hollywood in December 1970 (tracks 1,4,7) & at The Record Plant, Hollywood in February 1971 (tracks 2,3,6). The album features a major contribution from songwriter and guitarist Bobby Womack, including the original version of Womack's "Breezin'", that George Benson would have a major hit with in 1976 (also produced by LiPuma). The composition "If You Don't Want My Love" was also used by Womack in his soundtrack to the film Across 110th Street.

Track listing
All tracks composed by Bobby Womack; except where indicated
"Breezin'"  - 3:11 	
"Amazon" - (Gábor Szabó)  4:57 	
"Fingers" - (Gábor Szabó, Wolfgang Melz)  7:34
"Azure Blue" - (Gábor Szabó) 4:15 	
"Just a Little Communication" - 7:51 	
"If You Don't Want My Love" - 4:37 	
"I Remember When" - 7:35

Personnel
Gábor Szabó - Electric guitar, Acoustic guitar
Bobby Womack - Electric rhythm guitar
Jim Keltner - Drums
Felix "Flaco" Falcon - Congas
The Shadow (a.k.a.Tommy LiPuma) - Tambourine, Gourd percussion, Record producer
Wolfgang Melz - Bass (2 - 6)
Phil Upchurch - Bass (1, 7)
Mark Levine - Piano (3)
Carmelo Garcia - Tom-tom (2), Timbales (3)
Rene Hall - String arrangements
Bruce Botnick - Audio engineer

Charts

Singles

External links
 Gábor Szabó-High Contrast at Discogs

References

1971 albums
Gábor Szabó albums
Blue Thumb Records albums
Albums produced by Tommy LiPuma
Albums recorded at Capitol Studios